Warrior Run Generating Station, owned by the AES Corporation, is a 205 megawatt cogeneration plant located south of Cumberland, Maryland, at 11600 Mexico Farms Road. In addition to electric power, the plant also produces food-grade carbon dioxide.

Design and operation
The plant uses fluidized bed combustion (FBC) technology, in which bituminous coal and finely ground limestone are injected, using air, into the boiler. Air keeps the limestone and coal suspended in a fluid-like condition. The limestone reacts with sulfur dioxide, released during combustion of the coal, removing this pollutant from the plant's emissions. During 2007, 100 percent of the coal burned at Warrior Run was mined in Maryland.

The FBC boiler operates at a lower temperature compared to other coal-fired boiler technology, reducing production of nitrogen oxides. Injection of ammonia and a selective non-catalytic reduction system are also used to remove nitrogen oxides. A baghouse removes particulates from the plant's air emissions.

Water used by the plant is supplied by the City of Cumberland water system. Fly and bottom ash from Warrior Run, which is highly alkaline due to the limestone used by the FBC boiler, is used as fill at four nearby surface coal mines.

Warrior Run surcharge
Warrior Run became operational on February 10, 2000. As provided by the Public Utility Regulatory Policies Act of 1978, the local utility, the Potomac Edison Company, which is a unit of FirstEnergy, is required to purchase the electric output of Warrior Run at its "avoided cost" rate under a contract for thirty years. However, this "avoided cost" rate, which was determined at the time of the contract, is higher than the current wholesale price of electricity, so Potomac Edison recovers the difference in this price through a surcharge on the bills of its customers. This surcharge will end in April 2030. In 2007 the Maryland Public Service Commission approved a plan permitting the Warrior Run electric output to be sold into the PJM Interconnection day-ahead wholesale market and the capacity bid into the PJM forward capacity market, with the proceeds used to reduce the surcharge.

See also

List of power stations in Maryland

References

External links
Photograph of AES Warrior Run generator

Energy infrastructure completed in 2000
Buildings and structures in Allegany County, Maryland
Coal-fired power stations in Maryland
Cogeneration power stations in the United States